English Premiership may refer to:

 Premiership Rugby, an English rugby union football league
 Premier League, an English association football league